USS Dean II (SP-98) was an armed motorboat that served in the United States Navy as a patrol vessel from 1917 to 1918.
 
Dean II was built as a civilian motorboat in 1915 at Greenport, New York. The U.S. Navy, which inspected her for possible naval use as a patrol boat in World War I and deemed her a "well built and seaworthy boat for her size", acquired her on 2 May 1917 under a free lease from her owner. She was commissioned on 10 May 1917 as USS Dean II (SP-98).

Dean II was assigned to the 3rd Naval District, where she performed patrol duty. In March 1918, she was ordered to be returned to her owner.  Decommissioned on 31 May 1918, she was returned to her owner on 16 July 1918.

Notes

References
 
 Department of the Navy Naval Historical Center Online Library of Selected Images: U.S. Navy Ships: USS Dean II (SP-98), 1917-1918. Originally the civilian motor boat Dean II (1915)
 NavSource Online: Section Patrol Craft Photo Archive: Dean II (SP 98)

Patrol vessels of the United States Navy
World War I patrol vessels of the United States
Ships built in Greenport, New York
1915 ships